Soe Myat Nandar (born 15 December 1979) is a two-time Myanmar Academy Award winning Burmese actress. She won her first Myanmar Academy Award for Best Supporting Actress in 2001 with the film Achit Ko Mwe Phwar Chin and achieved her second award for Best Supporting Actress in 2004 with film Chit Chin Nge Pyaing.

Soe is considered one of the most successful actresses in Burmese cinema. Throughout her career, she has acted in over 170 films.

Early life and education 
Soe Myat Nandar was born on 15 December 1979 in Dawei, Tanintharyi Division, Myanmar to parent Soe Myint, a retired major and his wife Kyi Kyi Khin. She is the youngest daughter of four siblings, having two elder sisters and one brother. Her elder sister Soe Myat Thuzar is also an actress. She attended high school at Basic Education High School No. 2 Bahan. She graduated from the University of Yangon in 2001.

Career
Soe began her entertainment career when she was recruited by director Kyaw Hein to film Kan Kaung Loh in 1996. She took on her first big-screen role in the film Chit Like Top One Two Three (ချစ်လိုက်တော့ ဝမ်းတူးသရီး) in 1997.

Personal life
In 2005, she married Phyoe Gyi, a singer. The couple divorced in 2007, after having a son, Myat Thaw Maung. She has been dating actor Soe Thu since 22 April 2014

Film

Awards and nominations

References

Living people
1979 births
21st-century Burmese actresses
20th-century Burmese actresses
Burmese film actresses

my:စိုးမြတ်နန္ဒာ